Eristalis obscura, the Dusky Drone Fly, is a  common  species of syrphid fly first officially described by  Loew in 1866  This species is widespread in the northern part of North America and Europe east to Siberia. Hoverflies get their names from the ability to remain nearly motionless while in flight The adults are also known as flower flies for they are commonly found around and on flowers from which they get both energy-giving nectar and protein-rich pollen. The larvae are aquatic filter-feeders of the rat-tailed type.

References

Further reading

 

 

Eristalinae
Articles created by Qbugbot
Insects described in 1866